Bengali, generally known by its endonym Bangla, is an Indo-Aryan language native to the Bengal region of South Asia. It is the official, national, and most widely spoken language of Bangladesh and the second most widely spoken of the 22 scheduled languages of India. With approximately 300 million native speakers and another 37 million as second language speakers, Bengali is the fifth most-spoken native language and the seventh most spoken language by total number of speakers in the world. Bengali is the fifth most spoken Indo-European language.

Bengali is the official and national language of Bangladesh, with 98% of Bangladeshis using Bengali as their first language. Within India, Bengali is the official language of the states of West Bengal, Tripura and the Barak Valley region of the state of Assam. It is also the second official language of the Indian state of Jharkhand since September 2011. It is the most widely spoken language in the Andaman and Nicobar Islands in the Bay of Bengal, and is spoken by significant populations in other states including Bihar, Arunachal Pradesh, Delhi, Chhattisgarh, Meghalaya, Mizoram, Nagaland, Odisha and Uttarakhand. Bengali is also spoken by the Bengali diasporas (Bangladeshi diaspora and Indian Bengalis) in Europe, the United States, the Middle East and other countries.

Bengali has developed over more than 1,300 years. Bengali literature, with its millennium-old literary history, was extensively developed during the Bengali Renaissance and is one of the most prolific and diverse literary traditions in Asia. The Bengali language movement from 1948 to 1956 demanding Bengali to be an official language of Pakistan fostered Bengali nationalism in East Bengal leading to the emergence of Bangladesh in 1971. In 1999, UNESCO recognised 21 February as International Mother Language Day in recognition of the language movement.

History

Ancient
Although Sanskrit was practised by Hindu Brahmins in Bengal since the mid-first millennium BC, the local Buddhist population were speaking in some varieties of the Prakrit. These varieties generally referred to as "eastern Magadhi Prakrit", as coined by linguist Suniti Kumar Chatterji, as the Middle Indo-Aryan dialects were influential in the first millennium when Bengal was a part of the Greater Magadhan realm.

The local varieties had no official status during the Gupta Empire, and with Bengal increasingly becoming a hub of Sanskrit literature for Hindu priests, the vernacular of Bengal gained a lot of influence from Sanskrit. Magadhi Prakrit was also spoken in modern-day Bihar and Assam, and this vernacular eventually evolved into Ardha Magadhi. Ardha Magadhi began to give way to what is known as Apabhraṃśa, by the end of the first millennium. The Bengali language evolved as a distinct language over the course of time.

Early
Though some archeologists claim that some 10th-century texts were in Bengali, it is not certain whether they represent a differentiated language or whether they represent a stage when Eastern Indo-Aryan languages were differentiating. The local Apabhraṃśa of the eastern subcontinent, Purbi Apabhraṃśa or Abahatta (lit. 'meaningless sounds'), eventually evolved into regional dialects, which in turn formed three groups, the Bengali–Assamese languages, the Bihari languages, and the Odia language. The language was not static: different varieties coexisted and authors often wrote in multiple dialects in this period. For example, Ardhamagadhi is believed to have evolved into Abahatta around the 6th century, which competed with the ancestor of Bengali for some time. The ancestor of Bengali was the language of the Pala Empire and the Sena dynasty.

Medieval

During the medieval period, Middle Bengali was characterised by the elision of the word-final  ô and the spread of compound verbs, which originated from the Sanskrit Schwa. Slowly, the word-final ô disappeared from many words influenced by the Arabic, Persian and Turkic languages. The arrival of merchants and traders from the Middle East and Turkestan into the Buddhist-ruling Pala Empire, from as early as the 7th century, gave birth to Islamic influence in the region. In the 13th century, the subsequent Muslim expeditions to Bengal greatly encouraged the migratory movements of Arab Muslims and Turco-Persians, who heavily influenced the local vernacular by settling among the native population.

Bengali acquired prominence, over Persian, in the court of the Sultans of Bengal with the ascent of Jalaluddin Muhammad Shah. Subsequent Muslim rulers actively promoted the literary development of Bengali, allowing it to become the most spoken vernacular language in the Sultanate. Bengali adopted many words from Arabic and Persian, which was a manifestation of Islamic culture on the language. Major texts of Middle Bengali (1400–1800) include Yusuf-Zulekha by Shah Muhammad Sagir and Srikrishna Kirtana by the Chandidas poets. Court support for Bengali culture and language waned when the Mughal Empire conquered Bengal in the late 16th and early 17th century.

Modern

The modern literary form of Bengali was developed during the 19th and early 20th centuries based on the dialect spoken in the Nadia region, a west-central Bengali dialect. Bengali presents a strong case of diglossia, with the literary and standard form differing greatly from the colloquial speech of the regions that identify with the language. The modern Bengali vocabulary contains the vocabulary base from Magadhi Prakrit and Pali, also tatsamas and reborrowings from Sanskrit and other major borrowings from Persian, Arabic, Austroasiatic languages and other languages in contact with.

During this period, there were two main forms of written Bengali:
  Chôlitôbhasha; colloquial form of Bengali using simplified inflections
  Sadhubhasha; Sanskritised form of Bengali.

In 1948, the Government of Pakistan tried to impose Urdu as the sole state language in Pakistan, starting the Bengali language movement. The Bengali Language Movement was a popular ethno-linguistic movement in the former East Bengal (today Bangladesh), which was a result of the strong linguistic consciousness of the Bengalis to gain and protect spoken and written Bengali's recognition as a state language of the then Dominion of Pakistan. On 21 February 1952, five students and political activists were killed during protests near the campus of the University of Dhaka, whom were the first ever Martyrs to die for their rights on speaking their mother language. In 1956, Bengali was made a state language of Pakistan. The day has since been observed as Language Movement Day in Bangladesh and is also commemorated as International Mother Language Day by UNESCO every year since 2000.

In 2010, the parliament of Bangladesh and the legislative assembly of West Bengal proposed that Bengali be made an official UN language, as of January 2023, no further action has been yet taken on this matter. However, in 2022, the UN has adopted Bangla as unofficial language, after a resolution tabled by India.

Geographical distribution

The Bengali language is native to the region of Bengal, which comprises the present-day nation of Bangladesh and the Indian state of West Bengal.

Besides the native region it is also spoken by the Bengalis living in Tripura, southern Assam and the Bengali population in the Indian union territory of Andaman and Nicobar Islands. Bengali is also spoken in the neighbouring states of Odisha, Bihar, and Jharkhand, and sizeable minorities of Bengali speakers reside in Indian cities outside Bengal, including Delhi, Mumbai, Thane, Varanasi, and Vrindavan. There are also significant Bengali-speaking communities in the Middle East, the United States, Singapore, Malaysia, Australia, Canada, the United Kingdom, and Italy.

Official status

The 3rd article of the Constitution of Bangladesh states Bengali to be the sole official language of Bangladesh. The Bengali Language Implementation Act, 1987 made it mandatory to use Bengali in all records and correspondences, laws, proceedings of court and other legal actions in all courts, government or semi-government offices, and autonomous institutions in Bangladesh. It is also the de facto national language of the country.

In India, Bengali is one of the 23 official languages. It is the official language of the Indian states of West Bengal, Tripura and in Barak Valley of Assam. Bengali has been a second official language of the Indian state of Jharkhand since September 2011.

In Pakistan, Bengali is a recognised secondary language in the city of Karachi. The Department of Bengali in the University of Karachi also offers regular programs of studies at the Bachelors and at the Masters levels for Bengali Literature.

The national anthems of both Bangladesh (Amar Sonar Bangla) and India (Jana Gana Mana) were written in Bengali by the Bengali Nobel laureate Rabindranath Tagore. Additionally, the first two verses of Vande Mataram, a patriotic song written in Bengali by Bankim Chandra Chatterjee, was adopted as the "national song" of India in both the colonial period and later in 1950 in independent India. Furthermore, it is believed by many that the national anthem of Sri Lanka (Sri Lanka Matha) was inspired by a Bengali poem written by Rabindranath Tagore, while some even believe the anthem was originally written in Bengali and then translated into Sinhala.

After the contribution made by the Bangladesh UN Peacekeeping Force in the Sierra Leone Civil War under the United Nations Mission in Sierra Leone, the government of Ahmad Tejan Kabbah declared Bengali as an honorary official language in December 2002.

In 2009, elected representatives in both Bangladesh and West Bengal called for Bengali to be made an official language of the United Nations.

Dialects

Regional variation in spoken Bengali constitutes a dialect continuum. Linguist Suniti Kumar Chatterji grouped the dialects of Bengali language into four large clusters- Rarhi, Vangiya, Kamrupi and Varendri; but many alternative grouping schemes have also been proposed. The south-western dialects (Rarhi or Nadia dialect) form the basis of modern standard colloquial Bengali. In the dialects prevalent in much of eastern and south-eastern Bangladesh (Barisal, Chittagong, Dhaka and Sylhet Divisions of Bangladesh), many of the stops and affricates heard in West Bengal are pronounced as fricatives. The influence of Tibeto-Burman languages on the phonology of Eastern Bengali is seen through the lack of nasalised vowels and an alveolar articulation of what are categorised as the "cerebral" consonants (as opposed to the postalveolar articulation of West Bengal). Some variants of Bengali, particularly Chittagonian and Chakma, have contrastive tone; differences in the pitch of the speaker's voice can distinguish words. Kharia Thar and Mal Paharia are closely related to Western Bengali dialects, but are typically classified as separate languages. Similarly, Hajong is considered a separate language, although it shares similarities to Northern Bengali dialects.

During the standardisation of Bengali in the 19th century and early 20th century, the cultural centre of Bengal was in Kolkata, a city founded by the British. What is accepted as the standard form today in both West Bengal and Bangladesh is based on the West-Central dialect of Nadia District, located next to the border of Bangladesh and 76 miles north of Kolkata. There are cases where speakers of Standard Bengali in West Bengal will use a different word from a speaker of Standard Bengali in Bangladesh, even though both words are of native Bengali descent. For example, the word salt is  nun in the west which corresponds to  lôbôṇ in the east.

Bengali exhibits diglossia, though some scholars have proposed triglossia or even n-glossia or heteroglossia between the written and spoken forms of the language. Two styles of writing have emerged, involving somewhat different vocabularies and syntax:
 Shadhu-bhasha ( "uptight language") was the written language, with longer verb inflections and more of a Pali and Sanskrit-derived Tatsama vocabulary. Songs such as India's national anthem Jana Gana Mana (by Rabindranath Tagore) were composed in this style. Its use in modern writing however is uncommon, restricted to some official signs and documents in Bangladesh as well as for achieving particular literary effects.
 Cholito-bhasha ( "running language"), known by linguists as Standard Colloquial Bengali, is a written Bengali style exhibiting a preponderance of colloquial idiom and shortened verb forms, and is the standard for written Bengali now. This form came into vogue towards the turn of the 19th century, promoted by the writings of Peary Chand Mitra (Alaler Gharer Dulal, 1857), Pramatha Chaudhuri (Sabujpatra, 1914) and in the later writings of Rabindranath Tagore. It is modelled on the dialect spoken in the Shantipur region in Nadia district, West Bengal. This form of Bengali is often referred to as the "Nadia standard", "Nadia dialect", "Southwestern/West-Central dialect" or "Shantipuri Bangla".

Linguist Prabhat Ranjan Sarkar categorises the language as:
 Madhya Rarhi dialect
 Kanthi (Contai) dialect
 Kolkata dialect
 Shantipuriya (Nadia) dialect
 Shershahabadia (Maldahiya/ Jangipuri) dialect
 Barendri dialect
 Rangapuriya dialect
 Shrihatti dialect
 Dhakiya (Bikrampuri) dialect
 Jashore/Jessoriya dialect
 Barisal (Chandradwip) dialect
 Chattal (Chittagong) dialect

While most writing is in Standard Colloquial Bengali (SCB), spoken dialects exhibit a greater variety. People in southeastern West Bengal, including Kolkata, speak in SCB. Other dialects, with minor variations from Standard Colloquial, are used in other parts of West Bengal and western Bangladesh, such as the Midnapore dialect, characterised by some unique words and constructions. However, a majority in Bangladesh speak in dialects notably different from SCB. Some dialects, particularly those of the Chittagong region, bear only a superficial resemblance to SCB. The dialect in the Chittagong region is least widely understood by the general body of Bengalis. The majority of Bengalis are able to communicate in more than one variety – often, speakers are fluent in Cholitobhasha (SCB) and one or more regional dialects.

Even in SCB, the vocabulary may differ according to the speaker's religion: Muslims are more likely to use words of Persian and Arabic origin, along with more words naturally derived from Sanskrit (tadbhava), whereas Hindus are more likely to use tatsama (words directly borrowed from Sanskrit). For example:

Phonology

The phonemic inventory of standard Bengali consists of 29 consonants and 7 vowels, as well as 7 nasalised vowels. The inventory is set out below in the International Phonetic Alphabet (upper grapheme in each box) and romanisation (lower grapheme).

Bengali is known for its wide variety of diphthongs, combinations of vowels occurring within the same syllable. The total number of diphthongs is not established, with bounds at 17 and 31. An incomplete chart is given by Sarkar (1985) of the following:

Stress
In standard Bengali, stress is predominantly initial. Bengali words are virtually all trochaic; the primary stress falls on the initial syllable of the word, while secondary stress often falls on all odd-numbered syllables thereafter, giving strings such as in  shô-hô-jo-gi-ta "cooperation", where the boldface represents primary and secondary stress.

Consonant clusters

Native Bengali words do not allow initial consonant clusters; the maximum syllabic structure is CVC (i.e., one vowel flanked by a consonant on each side). Many speakers of Bengali restrict their phonology to this pattern, even when using Sanskrit or English borrowings, such as  geram (CV.CVC) for  gram (CCVC) "village" or  iskul (VC.CVC) for  skul (CCVC) "school".

Writing system

Bengali-Assamese script is an abugida, a script with letters for consonants, diacritics for vowels, and in which an inherent vowel (অ ô) is assumed for consonants if no vowel is marked. The Bengali alphabet is used throughout Bangladesh and eastern India (Assam, West Bengal, Tripura). The Bengali alphabet is believed to have evolved from a modified Brahmic script around 1000 CE (or 10th–11th century). It is a cursive script with eleven graphemes or signs denoting nine vowels and two diphthongs, and thirty-nine graphemes representing consonants and other modifiers. There are no distinct upper and lower case letter forms. The letters run from left to right and spaces are used to separate orthographic words. Bengali script has a distinctive horizontal line running along the tops of the graphemes that links them together called  matra.

Since the Bengali script is an abugida, its consonant graphemes usually do not represent phonetic segments, but carry an "inherent" vowel and thus are syllabic in nature. To emphatically represent a consonant sound without any inherent vowel attached to it, a special diacritic, called the hôsôntô , may be added below the basic consonant grapheme (as in  ). This diacritic, however, is not common, and is chiefly employed as a guide to pronunciation. The abugida nature of Bengali consonant graphemes is not consistent, however.

A consonant sound followed by some vowel sound other than the inherent  is orthographically realised by using a variety of vowel allographs above, below, before, after, or around the consonant sign, thus forming the ubiquitous consonant-vowel typographic ligatures. These allographs, called  kar, are diacritical vowel forms and cannot stand on their own. For example, the graph   represents the consonant  followed by the vowel , where  is represented as the diacritical allograph (called  i-kar) and is placed before the default consonant sign. In these consonant-vowel ligatures, the so-called "inherent" vowel  is first expunged from the consonant before adding the vowel, but this intermediate expulsion of the inherent vowel is not indicated in any visual manner on the basic consonant sign  .

The vowel graphemes in Bengali can take two forms: the independent form found in the basic inventory of the script and the dependent, abridged, allograph form (as discussed above). To represent a vowel in isolation from any preceding or following consonant, the independent form of the vowel is used. For example, in   "ladder" and in   "Hilsa fish", the independent form of the vowel  is used (cf. the dependent form. A vowel at the beginning of a word is always realised using its independent form.

In addition to the inherent-vowel-suppressing hôsôntô, three more diacritics are commonly used in Bengali. These are the superposed chôndrôbindu , denoting a suprasegmental for nasalisation of vowels (as in   "moon"), the postposed ônusbar  indicating the velar nasal  (as in   "Bengali") and the postposed bisôrgô  indicating the voiceless glottal fricative  (as in   "ouch!") or the gemination of the following consonant (as in   "sorrow").

The Bengali consonant clusters ( juktôbênjôn) are usually realised as ligatures, where the consonant which comes first is put on top of or to the left of the one that immediately follows. In these ligatures, the shapes of the constituent consonant signs are often contracted and sometimes even distorted beyond recognition. In the Bengali writing system, there are nearly 285 such ligatures denoting consonant clusters. Although there exist a few visual formulas to construct some of these ligatures, many of them have to be learned by rote. Recently, in a bid to lessen this burden on young learners, efforts have been made by educational institutions in the two main Bengali-speaking regions (West Bengal and Bangladesh) to address the opaque nature of many consonant clusters, and as a result, modern Bengali textbooks are beginning to contain more and more "transparent" graphical forms of consonant clusters, in which the constituent consonants of a cluster are readily apparent from the graphical form. However, since this change is not as widespread and is not being followed as uniformly in the rest of the Bengali printed literature, today's Bengali-learning children will possibly have to learn to recognise both the new "transparent" and the old "opaque" forms, which ultimately amounts to an increase in learning burden.

Bengali punctuation marks, apart from the downstroke  daṛi – the Bengali equivalent of a full stop – have been adopted from western scripts and their usage is similar.

Unlike in western scripts (Latin, Cyrillic, etc.) where the letter-forms stand on an invisible baseline, the Bengali letter-forms instead hang from a visible horizontal left-to-right headstroke called  matra. The presence and absence of this matra can be important. For example, the letter  tô and the numeral  "3" are distinguishable only by the presence or absence of the matra, as is the case between the consonant cluster  trô and the independent vowel  e, also the letter  hô and Bengali Ôbogroho  (~ô) and letter  o and consonant cluster  ttô. The letter-forms also employ the concepts of letter-width and letter-height (the vertical space between the visible matra and an invisible baseline).

There is yet to be a uniform standard collating sequence (sorting order of graphemes to be used in dictionaries, indices, computer sorting programs, etc.) of Bengali graphemes. Experts in both Bangladesh and India are currently working towards a common solution for this problem.

Alternative and historic scripts

Throughout history there have been instances of the Bengali language being written in different scripts, though these employments were never popular on a large scale and were communally limited. Owing to Bengal's geographic location, Bengali areas bordering non-Bengali regions have been influenced by each other. Small numbers of people in Midnapore, which borders Odisha, have used the Odia script to write in Bengali. In the border areas between West Bengal and Bihar, some Bengali communities historically wrote Bengali in Devanagari, Kaithi and Tirhuta.

In Sylhet and Bankura, modified versions of the Kaithi script had some historical prominence, mainly among Muslim communities. The variant in Sylhet was identical to the Baitali Kaithi script of Hindustani with the exception of Sylhet Nagri possessing matra.

Up until the 19th century, numerous variations of the Arabic script had been used across Bengal from Chittagong in the east to Meherpur in the west. The 14th-century court scholar of Bengal, Nur Qutb Alam, composed Bengali poetry using the Persian alphabet. After the Partition of India in the 20th century, the Pakistani government attempted to institute the Perso-Arabic script as the standard for Bengali in East Pakistan; this was met with resistance and contributed to the Bengali language movement.

In the 16th century, Portuguese missionaries began a tradition of using the Roman alphabet to transcribe the Bengali language. Though the Portuguese-standard did not receive much growth, a few Roman Bengali works relating to Christianity and Bengali grammar were printed as far as Lisbon in 1743. The Portuguese were followed by the English and French respectively, whose works were mostly relating to Bengali grammar and transliteration. The first version of the Aesop's Fables in Bengali was printed using Roman letters based on English phonology by the Scottish linguist John Gilchrist. Consecutive attempts to establish a Roman Bengali has continued across every century since these times, and have been supported by the likes of Suniti Kumar Chatterji, Muhammad Qudrat-i-Khuda and Muhammad Enamul Haq. The Digital Revolution has also played a part in the adoption of the English alphabet to write Bengali, with certain social media influencers publishing entire novels in Roman Bengali.

Orthographic depth

The Bengali script in general has a comparatively shallow orthography, i.e., in most cases there is a one-to-one correspondence between the sounds (phonemes) and the letters (graphemes) of Bengali. But grapheme-phoneme inconsistencies do occur in certain cases.

One kind of inconsistency is due to the presence of several letters in the script for the same sound. In spite of some modifications in the 19th century, the Bengali spelling system continues to be based on the one used for Sanskrit, and thus does not take into account some sound mergers that have occurred in the spoken language. For example, there are three letters (and ) for the voiceless postalveolar fricative , although the letter  retains the voiceless alveolar sibilant  sound when used in certain consonant conjuncts as in   "fall",   "beat", etc. The letter  also retains the voiceless retroflex sibilant  sound when used in certain consonant conjuncts as in   "suffering",   "clan", etc. Similarly, there are two letters ( and ) for the voiced postalveolar affricate . The near-open front unrounded vowel  is orthographically realised by multiple means, as seen in the following examples:   "so much",   "academy",   "amoeba",   "to see",   "busy",   "grammar".

Another kind of inconsistency is concerned with the incomplete coverage of phonological information in the script. The inherent vowel attached to every consonant can be either  or  depending on vowel harmony with the preceding or following vowel or on the context, but this phonological information is not captured by the script, creating ambiguity for the reader. Furthermore, the inherent vowel is often not pronounced at the end of a syllable, as in   "less", but this omission is not generally reflected in the script, making it difficult for the new reader.

Many consonant clusters have different sounds than their constituent consonants. The Bengali writing system is, therefore, not always a true guide to pronunciation.

Uses
The script used for Bengali, Assamese and other languages is known as Bengali script. The script is known as the Bengali alphabet for Bengali and its dialects and the Assamese alphabet for Assamese language with some minor variations. Other related languages in the nearby region also make use of the Bengali script like the Meitei language in the Indian state of Manipur, where the Meitei language has been written in the Bengali script for centuries, though the Meitei script has been promoted in recent times.

Number system 
Bengali digits are as follows.

There are additional digits for fractions and prices, though they are little used any longer.

Romanisation

There are various Romanisation systems used for Bengali created in recent years which have failed to represent the true Bengali phonetic sound. The Bengali alphabet has often been included with the group of Brahmic scripts for romanisation where the true phonetic value of Bengali is never represented. Some of them are the International Alphabet of Sanskrit Transliteration, or IAST system (based on diacritics); "Indian languages Transliteration", or ITRANS (uses upper case letters suited for ASCII keyboards); and the National Library at Kolkata romanisation.

In the context of Bengali romanisation, it is important to distinguish transliteration from transcription. Transliteration is orthographically accurate (i.e. the original spelling can be recovered), whereas transcription is phonetically accurate (the pronunciation can be reproduced).

Although it might be desirable to use a transliteration scheme where the original Bengali orthography is recoverable from the Latin text, Bengali words are currently Romanized on Wikipedia using a phonemic transcription, where the true phonetic pronunciation of Bengali is represented with no reference to how it is written.

The most recent attempt has been by publishers Mitra and Ghosh with the launch of three popular children's books, Abol Tabol, Hasi Khusi and Sahoj Path in Roman script at the Kolkata Book Fair 2018. Published under the imprint of Benglish Books, these are based on phonetic transliteration and closely follow spellings used in social media but for using an underline to describe soft consonants.

Grammar

Bengali nouns are not assigned gender, which leads to minimal changing of adjectives (inflection). However, nouns and pronouns are moderately declined (altered depending on their function in a sentence) into four cases while verbs are heavily conjugated, and the verbs do not change form depending on the gender of the nouns.

Word order
As a head-final language, Bengali follows a subject–object–verb word order, although variations on this theme are common. Bengali makes use of postpositions, as opposed to the prepositions used in English and other European languages. Determiners follow the noun, while numerals, adjectives, and possessors precede the noun.

Yes-no questions do not require any change to the basic word order; instead, the low (L) tone of the final syllable in the utterance is replaced with a falling (HL) tone. Additionally, optional particles (e.g.  -ki,  -na, etc.) are often encliticised onto the first or last word of a yes-no question.

Wh-questions are formed by fronting the wh-word to focus position, which is typically the first or second word in the utterance.

Nouns
Nouns and pronouns are inflected for case, including nominative, objective, genitive (possessive), and locative. The case marking pattern for each noun being inflected depends on the noun's degree of animacy. When a definite article such as  -ṭa (singular) or  -gulo (plural) is added, as in the tables below, nouns are also inflected for number.

In most of the Bengali grammar books, cases are divided into 6 categories and an additional possessive case (possessive form is not recognised as a type of case by Bengali grammarians). But in terms of usages, cases are generally grouped into only 4 categories.

When counted, nouns take one of a small set of measure words. Nouns in Bengali cannot be counted by adding the numeral directly adjacent to the noun. An appropriate measure word (MW), a classifier, must be used between the numeral and the noun (most languages of the Mainland Southeast Asia linguistic area are similar in this respect). Most nouns take the generic measure word  -ṭa, though other measure words indicate semantic classes (e.g.  -jôn for humans). There is also the classifier -khana, and its diminutive form -khani, which attach only to nouns denoting something flat, long, square, or thin. These are the least common of the classifiers.

Measuring nouns in Bengali without their corresponding measure words (e.g.  aṭ biṛal instead of  aṭ-ṭa biṛal "eight cats") would typically be considered ungrammatical. However, when the semantic class of the noun is understood from the measure word, the noun is often omitted and only the measure word is used, e.g.  Shudhu êk-jôn thakbe. (lit. "Only one-MW will remain.") would be understood to mean "Only one person will remain.", given the semantic class implicit in  -jôn.

In this sense, all nouns in Bengali, unlike most other Indo-European languages, are similar to mass nouns.

Verbs
There are two classes of verbs: finite and non-finite. Non-finite verbs have no inflection for tense or person, while finite verbs are fully inflected for person (first, second, third), tense (present, past, future), aspect (simple, perfect, progressive), and honour (intimate, familiar, and formal), but not for number. Conditional, imperative, and other special inflections for mood can replace the tense and aspect suffixes. The number of inflections on many verb roots can total more than 200.

Inflectional suffixes in the morphology of Bengali vary from region to region, along with minor differences in syntax.

Bengali differs from most Indo-Aryan Languages in the zero copula, where the copula or connective be is often missing in the present tense. Thus, "he is a teacher" is  se shikkhôk, (literally "he teacher"). In this respect, Bengali is similar to Russian and Hungarian. Romani grammar is also the closest to Bengali grammar.

Vocabulary

Bengali has as many as 100,000 separate words, of which 50,000 are considered Tadbhavas, 21,100 are Tatsamas and the remainder loanwords from Austroasiatic and other foreign languages.

However, these figures do not take into account the large proportion of archaic or highly technical words that are very rarely used. Furthermore, different dialects use more Persian and Arabic vocabulary especially in different areas of Bangladesh and Muslim majority areas of West Bengal. Hindus, on the other hand, use more Sanskrit vocabulary than Muslims. Standard Bengali is based on the Nadia dialect spoken in the Hindu majority states of West Bengal and parts of Muslim majority division of Khulna in Bangladesh. About 90% of Bengalis in Bangladesh (ca. 148 million) and 27% of Bengalis in West Bengal and 10% in Assam (ca. 36 million) are Muslim and the Bangladeshi Muslims and some of the Indian Bengali Muslims speak a more "persio-arabised" version of Bengali instead of the more Sanskrit influenced Standard Nadia dialect although majority of the Indian Bengalis of West Bengal speaks in Rarhi dialect irrespective of religion. The productive vocabulary used in modern literary works, in fact, is made up mostly (67%) of Tadbhavas, while Tatsamas make up only 25% of the total. Loanwords from non-Indic languages account for the remaining 8% of the vocabulary used in modern Bengali literature.

According to Suniti Kumar Chatterji, dictionaries from the early 20th century attributed to a little more 50% of the Bengali vocabulary to native words (i.e., naturally modified Sanskrit words, corrupted forms of Sanskrit words, and loanwords non-Indo-European languages). About 45% percent of Bengali words are unmodified Sanskrit, and the remaining words are from foreign languages. Dominant in the last group was Persian, which was also the source of some grammatical forms. More recent studies suggest that the use of native and foreign words has been increasing, mainly because of the preference of Bengali speakers for the colloquial style. Because of centuries of contact with Europeans, Turkic peoples, and Persians, Bengali has absorbed numerous words from foreign languages, often totally integrating these borrowings into the core vocabulary.

The most common borrowings from foreign languages come from three different kinds of contact. After close contact with several indigenous Austroasiatic languages, and later the Mughal invasion whose court language was Persian, numerous Chagatai, Arabic, and Persian words were absorbed into the lexicon.

Later, East Asian travellers and lately European colonialism brought words from Portuguese, French, Dutch, and most significantly English during the colonial period.

Sample text
The following is a sample text in Bengali of Article 1 of the Universal Declaration of Human Rights:

See also
 Bangla Academy
 Bengali dialects
 Bengali numerals
 Bengali-language newspapers
 Chittagonian language
 Languages of Bangladesh
 Rangpuri language
 Romani people
 Sylheti language

Notes

References

 
 
 
 
 
 
 Chakraborty, Byomkes, A Comparative Study of Santali and Bengali, K.P. Bagchi & Co., Kolkata, 1994, .
 
 
 
 
 
 
 

 
 
 
 
 
 
 
 
 
 
 
 Shaw, Rameswar Sadharan Bhasabigna O Bangal Bhasa, Pustak Bipani, Kolkata, 1997.
 Haldar, Narayan Bengali Bhasa Prsanga: Banan Kathan Likhanriti, Pustak Bipani, Kolkata, 2007.

Further reading
 Thompson, Hanne-Ruth (2012). Bengali. Volume 18 of London Oriental and African Language Library. John Benjamins Publishing. .

External links
 
 The South Asian Literary Recordings Project: Bengali Authors at the Library of Congress

 
Eastern Indo-Aryan languages
Languages of Bangladesh
Official languages of India
Subject–object–verb languages
Languages of West Bengal
Languages of Tripura
Languages of Assam
Languages officially written in Indic scripts
Sahitya Akademi recognised languages
Languages of Jharkhand
Languages of Bihar